Pinalia floribunda is a species of orchid found in Myanmar, Thailand, Vietnam, Malaysia, Indonesia and the Philippines in montane forests at elevations of 500 to 2400 meters above sea level. It is a small to medium-sized, warm-to-cold growing epiphyte found on large trees along streams. It has erect, stem-like, narrow ellipsoid pseudo-bulbs carrying soft leaves that flower in the spring.

References

floribunda